Philip Morris International Inc. (PMI) is an American multinational tobacco company, with products sold in over 180 countries. The most recognized and best selling product of the company is Marlboro.  Philip Morris International is often referred to as one of the companies comprising Big Tobacco.

Until a spin-off in March 2008, Philip Morris International was an operating company of Altria. Altria explained the spin-off, arguing PMI would have more "freedom," i.e. leeway outside the responsibilities and standards of American corporate ownership in terms of potential litigation and legislative restrictions to "pursue sales growth in emerging markets", while Altria focuses on the American domestic market. The shareholders in Altria at the time were given shares in PMI, which was listed on the London Stock Exchange and other markets.

The company's legal seat is in Stamford, Connecticut, but it does not operate in the United States of America. Philip Morris USA, a subsidiary of PMI's former owner American parent Altria group, owns the Philip Morris brands there. PMI's operational headquarters are in Lausanne, Switzerland.

With tobacco being addictive and the single greatest cause of preventable death globally, the company is highly controversial, not least because of its history of obfuscating scientific evidence around the health impacts of smoking. It has been the subject of litigation and restrictive legislation from governments.

With the world-wide decrease in smoking prevalence in the 21st century, shares of Philip Morris were no longer considered the "safe haven" they once were. However, it has to be noted that the absolute number of smokers continues to increase. The company ranked No. 101 in the 2021 Fortune 500 list of the largest corporations by total revenue.

History

Early development 
The company states its history is traced to a London tobacconist, Philip Morris, opening a single shop on London's Bond Street in 1847 which sold tobacco and cigarettes. In 1881, Philip Morris' son, Leopold Morris, established "Philip Morris & Company and Grunebaum Ltd" with Joseph Grunebaum. In 1885, the company changed its name to "Philip Morris & Co. Ltd."

In 1894, William Curtis Thomson and his family began to control the company, and in 1902 the company was incorporated in New York. In 1919, the American business was acquired and incorporated as "Philip Morris & Co. Ltd., Inc." in Virginia.

Later development 

In 1954, Philip Morris (Australia) became the first affiliate of Philip Morris & Co., Ltd, Inc. outside the U.S. In 1972, the company's Marlboro became the world's top-selling cigarette brand.

In 1987, Philip Morris International (PMI) was incorporated as an operating company of Philip Morris Companies Inc. In 2001, the operations center of the company was transferred from Rye Brook, New York, to Lausanne, Switzerland. On January 27, 2003, Philip Morris Companies Inc. formally changed its name to the Altria Group. In March 2008, Philip Morris International was spun off from Altria.

In April 2014, Philip Morris International announced that it would close its Moorabbin plant in Australia by the end of 2014 after operating for 60 years, due to the gradual decline of sales in the last ten years and difficulties conforming to 2010 Australian government regulation about reducing fire risks. In 2015, the company sold 850 billion cigarettes.

In August 2018 Reuters reported that Philip Morris "has been among foreign companies with exposure to Russia’s tobacco market. The company’s sales exposure to Russia is 7 percent, according to a note from Goldman Sachs."

As of 2019, main institutional investors are The Vanguard Group with an 8% stake, Capital Research & Management with 5% and BlackRock Fund Advisors with 4%.

In July 2021, Philip Morris International agreed to buy Vectura for £1 billion.

In November 2021, Philip Morris International announced the relocation of its corporate headquarters from New York to Stamford, Connecticut, which expected to take effect in Summer 2022, while its operational center remained in Lausanne.

In 2022, due to the Russian invasion of Ukraine and boycott of the Russian market by many international companies, the company has faced trouble due to its high level of exposure to the Russian market, from which it was reluctant to disinvest. On the same year, PMI has agreed to a $16 billion deal with Swedish Match which would boost its position in cigarette alternatives.

Brands
Philip Morris International has six multibillion US$ brands including:
 Dji Sam Soe 234 was launched in 1913 and is a brand of kretek cigarettes. It is the best seller of kretek cigarettes in Indonesia. An iconic brand that is more than 100 years old and became the kretek cultural heritage. 
 L&M was launched by Liggett & Myers in 1953 with the tagline: "American cigarettes of the highest quality with the best filter." L&M variants include full flavor shorts, full flavor 100s, lights, ultra lights, menthol shorts, menthol 100s, menthol light shorts, menthol light 100s, Turkish Blend shorts, Turkish Blend 100s, and L&M Mild Kretek.
 Longbeach include in Australia and Indonesia in 1999. Longbeach variant include: Longbeach Filter and Longbeach Mild.
 Marlboro was launched in 1904. Marlboro is the premium brand. Marlboro variants include: Marlboro Special, Marlboro Menthol, Marlboro Lights, Marlboro Lights Menthol, Marlboro Mix-9 Filter Kretek, Marlboro Flavor Plus, Marlboro Black Menthol, and Heatsticks, a heated tobacco product. The company's Marlboro brand ranked first among the most valuable tobacco brands of 2017 on BrandFinance's website, which uses the royalty relief method of brand valuation.
 ST Dupont Paris is the brand cigarette designed by Simon Tissot Dupont in 1902. With the black packaging. ST Dupont Paris variants include: filter, lights, menthol, and menthol lights.
 A Mild or Sampoerna A was launched in Indonesia on 1989. A Mild is a mild kretek cigarette sold in Indonesia. The iconic brands and best selling brand from Indonesia, now sold in Malaysia.
 Chesterfield was launched in 1896. Chesterfield is the third-largest international brand from Philip Morris, with a volume of 57 Billion cigarettes in 2019.
 Philip Morris is the fourth-largest international brand from Philip Morris, with a volume of 49 Billion cigarettes in 2019 and is sold in over 40 markets.

Board of directors
As of November, 2021:

 Bonin Bough
 Michel Combes
 André Calantzopoulos – Chairman
 Juan José Daboub
 Werner Geissler
 Lisa Hook
 Jennifer Li
 Jun Makihara
 Kalpana Morparia
 Lucio A. Noto
 Frederik Paulsen Jr
 Robert B. Polet
 Shlomo Yanai

Finances 
For the fiscal year 2020 Philip Morris reported earnings of US$8.056 billion with an annual revenue of US$78.047 billion, a decrease of 1.6% over the previous fiscal cycle. Its shares traded at over $87 per share, and its market capitalization was valued at over US$127.5 billion at the end of the fiscal year 2020.

Carbon footprint
Philip Morris International reported Total CO2e emissions (Direct + Indirect) for the twelve months ending 31 December 2020 at 492 Kt (-175 /-26.2% y-o-y) and commits to reduce absolute emissions 50% by 2030 from a 2019 base year. This science-based target is aligned with Paris Agreement to limit global warming to 1.5 °C above pre-industrial levels.

Research

Philip Morris International's research center is located in Neuchatel, Switzerland and houses Philip Morris International's product research and development program. As of April 2018, earnings reports showed the company had spent $4.5 billion on four products: two that heat rather than burn tobacco, and two other nicotine products. One of these heat-not-burn tobacco products is IQOS.

Controversies

Foundation for a Smoke-free World

In September 2017, Philip Morris International announced the establishment of the Foundation for a Smoke-Free World, stating that it would support it with almost US$1 billion of funding over the next 12 years. The declared objective of the Foundation was to "evaluate the impact that smoke-free alternatives can have on smokers and public health, assess the effect of reduced cigarette consumption on the industry value chain, and measure overall progress towards a smoke-free world."
However, the Foundation, which claimed to be independent, was surrounded with controversy since its inception. 
Its claims to independence have been challenged.

The World Health Organization issued a statement in which it pointed out the "conflicts of interest involved with a tobacco company funding a purported health foundation", indicating that it would not partner with the Foundation and inviting governments and the public health community to follow its lead. More than one hundred public health organizations have taken a strong stance in rejecting collaboration with the foundation.

Australia
The Australian Government announced it would introduce "Tobacco Plain Packaging Laws" on 29 April 2010. Philip Morris International (PMI), arranged for its wholly owned Hong Kong subsidiary Philip Morris Asia (PMA) to 'takeover' two Australian subsidiaries – Philip Morris Australia Limited and Philip Morris Limited on 23 February 2011. In June 2011, Philip Morris International announced that it was using ISDS provisions in the Australia-Hong Kong Bilateral Investment treaty (BIT) to demand compensation for Australia's plain cigarette packaging anti-smoking legislation. It was one of several tobacco companies to launch legal action against the Australian Government.
In response, British American Tobacco, Philip Morris, Imperial Tobacco and Japan Tobacco International took the Australian government to the High Court of Australia to try to stop the government of Australia from introducing plain packaging for tobacco products.

Two challenges to the tobacco plain packaging legislation were heard by the High Court of Australia between 17 and 19 April 2012: 'British American Tobacco Australasia Limited and Ors v. Commonwealth of Australia' and 'J T International SA v. Commonwealth of Australia'.

On 15 August 2012, the High Court handed down orders for these matters, and found that the Tobacco Plain Packaging Act 2011 is not contrary to s 51(xxxi) of the Constitution. On 5 October 2012, the Court handed down its reasons for the decision. By a 6:1 majority (Heydon J in dissent) the Court held that there had been no acquisition of property that would have required provision of 'just terms' under s51(xxxi) of the Constitution.

On 18 December 2015, the Tribunal instituted by the United Nations Commission on International Trade Law (UNCITRAL) issued a unanimous decision (3–0) agreeing with Australia's position that the Tribunal has no jurisdiction to hear PMA's claim. This was due to the fact that PMI used its wholly owned subsidiary PMA to takeover the Australian-based PM subsidiaries in order to specifically sue the Australian Government for bringing in plain packaging laws. PMI was unable to do this itself as the Australia–United States free-trade agreement signed in 2004 did not have any investor-state dispute settlement clauses included—by design.

In 2017, the Dispute Settlement Body of the World Trade Organization supported Australia's right to enforce plain packaging. In 2017, PMI was instructed to pay the Australia government's legal costs, an estimated 50 million dollars.

In March 2018, the Tobacco giant announced that it will cut 150 jobs as part of a major restructure. Tammy Chan, the managing director in Australia, said more efficient ways to deal with retailers were introduced based on digital technology development.

European Union
In 2004, Philip Morris and the European Union reached an agreement according to which Philip Morris would pay $1.25bn until 2016 to end a lawsuit over smuggling charges.

Norway
Philip Morris also sued Norway over the country's ban on displaying tobacco products in stores. It lost the case in 2012.

Uruguay
In 2010, the company lobbied against Uruguay's strong anti-smoking laws and filed a complaint against the country (Philip Morris v. Uruguay) under the Switzerland-Uruguay bilateral investment treaty. On 8 July 2016, the International Centre for Settlement of Investment Disputes ruled in favour of Uruguay.

United Kingdom
In August 2014, the company foreshadowed legal action against the Government of the United Kingdom if it went ahead with plans to introduce plain packaging. In a submission to the government, Philip Morris International said it would seek compensation running into "billions of pounds," if the proposed legislation went ahead.

In 2018, an advertising campaign was criticized as hypocritical for urging smokers to quit while promoting other products such as heated tobacco.

IQOS 

In 2017, according to two editors of the journal JAMA Internal Medicine, after publication of a research letter describing harmful chemicals in heat-not-burn tobacco products, people from Philip Morris International contacted the institutions where the researchers worked and questioned the methods used in the study; the editors described this as a form of "pressure to suppress discourse that could harm commercial interests".

In December 2017, Reuters published documents and testimonies of former employees detailing irregularities in the clinical trials conducted by Philip Morris International for the approval of the IQOS product by the FDA.

In October 2020, Philip Morris launched its IQOS products in the UAE. The country had officially legalised the sale and use of electronic cigarettes in April 2019. The U.S. Food and Drug Administration (FDA) authorised the marketing of IQOS system, which includes IQOS devices and 3 HeatSticks variants, as a modified risk tobacco product (MRTP) in July 2020. IQOS is the first electronic alternative to cigarettes to be granted marketing orders through the FDA's MRTP process.

Cigarette smuggling in Africa 
According to the Organized Crime and Corruption Reporting Project (OCCRP), Philip Morris' representative in Burkina Faso, Apollinaire Compaoré, has earned millions by participating in cigarette smuggling in West Africa. In particular, he worked with a Nigerian narco-trafficker Chérif Ould Abidine, nicknamed Chérif Cocaine, to smuggle Marlboro cigarettes into Libya. This tobacco trafficking contributes to the financing of local conflicts and passes through six countries: Algeria, Libya, Burkina Faso, Mali, Niger and Côte d'Ivoire.

Other

From the 1970s to the late 1990s, Phillip Morris along with British American Tobacco, was involved in campaigns to undermine bans against smoking in Muslim majority countries by branding Muslims who opposed smoking as a "'fundamentalist’ who wishes to return to sharia law," and be "a threat to existing government as” according to leaked documents. A 1985 report from Philip Morris squarely blamed the World Health Organization: “This ideological development has become a threat to our business because of the interference of the WHO [...] The WHO has not only joined forces with Muslim fundamentalists who view smoking as evil, but has gone yet further by encouraging religious leaders previously not active anti-smokers to take up the cause." Philip Morris has refused to comment on these findings.

Philip Morris International has announced an overhaul of its human rights protections of tobacco workers in Kazakhstan and 30 other countries after critical reports.

The company runs an information web site outlining the health issues of tobacco. However, it has been criticised in an article in the journal Public Health Nursing as merely a "public relations effort" intended to "undermine public health".

In the 1930s, the company's tobacco advertisements were a steady source of income for numerous medical organizations and journals, including the New England Journal of Medicine (NEJM) and the Journal of the American Medical Association (JAMA).

In February 2015, John Oliver highlighted the company's many international legal cases on an episode of his television show Last Week Tonight. He also attempted to raise awareness for his campaign using the hashtag #JeffWeCan.

Sponsorship

Philip Morris is a long-term main sponsor of the Formula One team Scuderia Ferrari. The sponsorship is subliminal in the logo in recent times due to restrictions in tobacco advertising. Marlboro-branded Ferrari and McLaren cars won several world titles with famous drivers such as Alain Prost, James Hunt, Niki Lauda, Ayrton Senna and Michael Schumacher. Philip Morris also sponsored several title winners in MotoGP, road racing and Indy Cars. The Ferrari Formula One deal before direct advertisements were banned was estimated to be worth £45 million a year as well as paying the multi-million salary of Schumacher.

Despite no longer being able to display the Marlboro logo on Ferrari cars, Philip Morris renewed its sponsorship deal with Ferrari in 2011, 2015, 2017, and 2018 up until 2021. The 2017 deal was reported to be worth $160 million a year.

Philip Morris's sponsorship of Ferrari was seen visually on the car again at the 2018 Japanese Grand Prix, with the cigarette company's "Mission Winnow" branding. This branding has been seen by authorities as an attempt to flout laws and rules banning tobacco advertising, and it was removed by Ferrari for the 2019 Australian Grand Prix after Australian authorities launched an investigation. Ferrari also decided to remove the branding for the 2019 Canadian Grand Prix and the 2019 French Grand Prix to avoid problems with bans on tobacco advertising. As of 2022, Mission Winnow/Phillip Morris International and Ferrari have decided to mutually end their title sponsorship and sponsorship agreement entirely.

In motorcycle racing, Philip Morris International sponsored Ducati Corse and Yamaha MotoGP teams. In 1999, Yamaha was sponsored by Marlboro until 2002 season of MotoGP series. In 2003, Marlboro has been a title sponsor of the team despite the company logo does not appear or riders motorcycle due to the tobacco advertising ban in European Union countries that were already in effect at that time. similarly it had been removed from Scuderia Ferrari Formula One race cars earlier in 2019. Marlboro would stopped the sponsorship on Ducati in 2007. During the Marlboro sponsorship period, Yamaha won the constructor championship in 2000 season and Ducati won the constructor title in 2007 season with Casey Stoner as rider champion.

In 2019, similar to Scuderia Ferrari Formula One team, Philip Morris International returned as a sponsor for Ducati MotoGP team with the cigarette company's "Mission Winnow" branding. The sponsorship has raised controversy in some countries like Australia and Italy. The case has been brought to Italian court. However, Philip Morris International spokesperson, Tomasso di Giovanni denied Mission Winnow being a tobacco advertising and instead is a company dedicated to developing and find ways to help smokers around the world to give up their tobacco addiction. The Australian federal Minister for Health and Victoria state Department of Health and Human Services has also launched a probe against Philip Morris International. Mission Winnow was forced to drop its branding during the 2019 French motorcycle Grand Prix in Le Mans and 2019 Australian Motorcycle Grand Prix in Phillip Island, Victoria due to local government regulations. By 2020 season, Mission Winnow has been dropped as Ducati main sponsor and has been replaced with Lenovo to fill the main sponsorship void.

References

External links
 

 
 "Morris study blasted: Commissioned study found smokers' early deaths helped Czech Republic". CNN Money (July 16, 2001).

 
1987 establishments in the United States
American companies established in 1987
Companies based in Stamford, Connecticut 
Companies based in Lausanne 
Companies listed on the New York Stock Exchange
Companies listed on the SIX Swiss Exchange
Corporate spin-offs
Holding companies established in 1987
Manufacturing companies established in 1987
Manufacturing companies based in Connecticut
Tobacco companies of the United States